Meneng may refer to:

 Meneng District, Nauru
 Meneng Constituency
 Meneng Hotel
 Meneng Stadium

es:Meneng
fr:Meneng
hr:Meneng
id:Meneng
it:Meneng
jv:Meneng
na:Meneng
nl:Meneng
ja:メネン地区
no:Meneng
pl:Meneng
pt:Meneng
ro:Meneng
ru:Мененг (округ)
fi:Meneng
sv:Meneng